Will Carrick-Smith, otherwise known as The Tree, (born 2 April 1992) is a rugby union player for Exeter Chiefs in the Aviva Premiership. He made his debut for the club against London Welsh on 11 November 2012. At 6 ft 11 Carrick-Smith is the tallest professional player currently to be contracted to an English Premiership side. However, the tallest player ever to be contracted to an English Premiership side is Richard Metcalfe, formerly of Newcastle Falcons and Northampton Saints.

At the end of the 2012/13 season Will Carrick-Smith went out to Australia on loan for the summer with Randwick.

On 25 August 2015, Carrick-Smith signed a permanent deal to join RFU Championship club London Scottish from the 2015–16 season, effectively leaving Exeter. On 17 March 2016, Carrick-Smith signed for Championship rivals Bedford Blues from the 2016–17 season onwards.

References

External links
 Exeter Player Profile
 Aviva Premiership Player Profile

Living people
1993 births
Exeter Chiefs players
People from Wandsworth